Cerquetti is an Italian surname. Notable people with the surname include: 

 (1931–2003), Italian politician
Anita Cerquetti (1931–2014), Italian dramatic soprano
Enea Cerquetti (1938–2021), Italian politician

Italian-language surnames